Ronald Jackson (15 October 1919 – 28 February 1980) was an English professional footballer, who played as a full back. He made over 250 appearances in the English Football League, between spells at Wrexham and Leicester City.

References

1919 births
1980 deaths
English footballers
Association football defenders
Wrexham A.F.C. players
Leicester City F.C. players
Kettering Town F.C. players
English Football League players